These are the songs that reached number one on the Top 40 Best Sellers chart in 1950 as published by Cash Box magazine. Artists were not specified in the charts of this time period so songs may represent more than one version. The artist who most popularized each song is listed.

See also
1950 in music
List of number-one singles of 1950 (U.S.)

References
https://web.archive.org/web/20110516091023/http://cashboxmagazine.com/archives/50s_files/1950.html

1950
United States Cash Box
1950 in American music